ACDF may refer to:

 Anterior cervical discectomy and fusion, a common surgical procedure
 Archive of the Congregation for the Doctrine of the Faith, the Catholic Church's documents dealing with doctrinal and theological issues related to church teaching
 Aeronautique Club de France, a French flying club based on Meaux-Esbly airfield, France, and created in 1897